Eric Bailey (born 26 November 1960 in Los Angeles, California) is a former basketball player with the Hobart Devils, Melbourne Tigers and Gold Coast Rollers in the National Basketball League (NBL).

Bailey attended Boise State University.
He played in the Australian NBL for Hobart between 1983 and 1984. In 1985, he moved to Melbourne where he played until 1989. In 1990, he transferred to Gold Coast where he stayed until 1991.

 Bailey is a motivational speaker who visits schools or corporations to deliver anti-drug and visionary messages.

References

External links

"Leadership: Eric BaileyOvercoming Obstacles": article about Bailey in Marketing Eye Magazine 

1960 births
Living people
Australian men's basketball players
Boise State Broncos men's basketball players
Gold Coast Rollers players
Hobart Devils players
Melbourne Tigers players